Elephant Song may refer to:

The Elephant Song, a Canadian stage play by Nicolas Billon	
Elephant Song (film), a 2014 Canadian film adaptation of the play directed by Charles Binamé and starring Bruce Greenwood and Xavier Dolan
"The Elephant Song" (song), a 1975 song by singer and recording artist Kamahl 
Elephant Song (Longyear novel), a 1982 novel by Barry Longyear
Elephant Song (Smith novel), a 1991 novel by Wilbur Smith

See also
 Elephant (Songs)